Union Township is one of the fifteen townships of Putnam County, Ohio, United States.  The 2000 census found 2,557 people in the township, 1,526 of whom lived in the unincorporated portions of the township.

Geography
Located in the central part of the county, it borders the following townships:
Greensburg Township - north
Ottawa Township - northeast
Pleasant Township - east
Sugar Creek Township - south
Jennings Township - southwest corner
Jackson Township - west
Perry Township - northwest corner

The village of Kalida is located in northwestern Union Township.

Name and history
Union Township was erected in 1832. It is one of twenty-seven Union Townships statewide.

Government
The township is governed by a three-member board of trustees, who are elected in November of odd-numbered years to a four-year term beginning on the following January 1. Two are elected in the year after the presidential election and one is elected in the year before it. There is also an elected township fiscal officer, who serves a four-year term beginning on April 1 of the year after the election, which is held in November of the year before the presidential election. Vacancies in the fiscal officership or on the board of trustees are filled by the remaining trustees.

References

External links
County website

Townships in Putnam County, Ohio
Townships in Ohio